Europaeum is an organisation of ten leading European universities.

Europaeum may also refer to:
 EUROPAEUM Institute for European Policy
 Institutum Europaeum, a Belgian think tank

See also
 Diarium Europaeum, a journal on the history of the German-speaking lands published between 1659 and 1683
 Theatrum Europaeum, a journal on the history of the German-speaking lands published between 1633 and 1738 
 European (disambiguation)